Epiregulin (EPR) is a protein that in humans is encoded by the EREG gene.

Structure 
Epiregulin consists of 46 amino acid residues. Its secondary structure contains approximately 30 percent of β-sheet in the strand. Some of the residues form loops and turns due to the hydrogen bonding. The percentage of β-sheet in epiregulin depends on the domain and the secondary structures that they occupy. The polymeric molecules of epiregulin has the formula weight of 5280.1 g/mol with a polypeptide(L), a polymer type.

Structural motifs in most proteins have typical connections in an all β motif. Meaning that the polypeptide chains do not make a crossover connection or in so far as this type of connection has not been observed. Epiregulin is one of the proteins that occupies a typical connection in all β motif. Furthermore, as the structure of epiregulin forms a chain in an all β motif, it also forms β hairpin structural motif. A β hairpin is when the two adjacent anti-parallel β strands connected by a β-turn.

Function 
Epiregulin is a member of the epidermal growth factor family. Epiregulin can function as a ligand of epidermal growth factor receptor (EGFR), as well as a ligand of most members of the ERBB (v-erb-b2 oncogene homolog) family of tyrosine-kinase receptors. The secondary structure at the C-terminus epiregulin is different from other epidermal growth factor family ligands because of the lack of hydrogen bonds. The structural difference at the C-terminus may provide an explanation for the reduced  binding affinity of epiregulin to the ERBB receptors.

References

Further reading